Roberto Aláiz Villacorta (born 20 July 1990, in León) is a male Spanish long-distance runner. He competed in the 3000 metres steeplechase event at the 2013 World Championships. He also competed in the 3000 metres steeplechase event at the 2015 World Championships in Beijing but did not finish.

Competition record

Personal bests
Outdoor
1500 metres – 3:43.26 (Madrid 2014)
3000 metres – 7:48.82 (Los Corrales de Buelna 2015)
5000 metres – 14:11.47 (Zürich 2014)
10,000 metres – 28:27.76 (Lisbon 2014)
3000 metres steeplechase – 8:19.85 (Eugene 2015)
Indoor
1500 metres – 3:45.67 (Oviedo 2013)
3000 metres – 7:51.5 (Valencia 2015)

References

1990 births
Living people
Spanish male long-distance runners
Spanish male steeplechase runners
Sportspeople from León, Spain
World Athletics Championships athletes for Spain
Athletes (track and field) at the 2013 Mediterranean Games
Mediterranean Games competitors for Spain
21st-century Spanish people